Dry Run is a census-designated place (CDP) in Hamilton County, Ohio, United States. The population was 7,672 at the 2020 census.

Geography
Dry Run is located at  (39.104361, -84.330595).

Demographics

At the 2000 census there were 6,553 people, 2,063 households, and 1,852 families living in the CDP. The population density was 1,378.3 people per square mile (532.7/km). There were 2,118 housing units at an average density of 445.5/sq mi (172.2/km).  The racial makeup of the CDP was 96.47% White, 0.66% African American, 0.05% Native American, 1.88% Asian, 0.26% from other races, and 0.69% from two or more races. Hispanic or Latino of any race were 0.96%.

Of the 2,063 households 52.3% had children under the age of 18 living with them, 84.4% were married couples living together, 3.6% had a female householder with no husband present, and 10.2% were non-families. 8.5% of households were one person and 3.5% were one person aged 65 or older. The average household size was 3.18 and the average family size was 3.38.

The age distribution was 34.2% under the age of 18, 4.7% from 18 to 24, 27.0% from 25 to 44, 28.0% from 45 to 64, and 6.0% 65 or older. The median age was 38 years. For every 100 females, there were 101.7 males. For every 100 females age 18 and over, there were 99.2 males.

The median household income was $100,373 and the median family income  was $104,337. Males had a median income of $75,209 versus $34,417 for females. The per capita income for the CDP was $39,552. About 1.7% of families and 2.0% of the population were below the poverty line, including 2.0% of those under age 18 and 1.2% of those age 65 or over.

References

Census-designated places in Hamilton County, Ohio
Census-designated places in Ohio